The 7.30 by-elections were held in South Korea on 30 July 2014. 15 seats to the National Assembly of South Korea were contested while re-election occurred for 1 seat to the Municipal Council of Suwon.

Causes for Elections
The following Members of National Assembly lost their seat:
 Seoul Dongjak 2nd District: Chung Mong-joon (Saenuri), due to his candidacy for the Metropolitan Mayor of Seoul.
 Busan Haeundae-Gijang 1st District: Suh Byung-soo (Saenuri), due to his candidacy for the Metropolitan Mayor of Busan.
 Gwangju Gwangsan 2nd District: Lee Yong-sup (Independent), due to his candidacy for the Metropolitan Mayor of Gwangju.
 Daejeon Daedeok: Park Seoung-hyo (Saenuri), due to his candidacy for the Metropolitan Mayor of Daejeon.
 Ulsan Nam 2nd District: Kim Gi-hyeon (Saenuri), due to his candidacy for the Metropolitan Mayor of Ulsan.
 Gyeonggi Suwon 2nd District: Shin Jang-yong (NPAD), due to his violation of the Public Official Election Act.
 Gyeonggi Suwon 3rd District: Nam Kyung-pil (Saenuri), due to his candidacy for the Governor of Gyeonggi.
 Gyeonggi Suwon 4th District: Kim Jin-pyo, due to his candidacy for the Governor of Gyeonggi.
 Gyeonggi Pyeongtaek 2nd District: Lee Jae-young (Saenuri), due to his violation of the Public Official Election Act and embezzlement.
 Gyeonggi Gimpo: Yoo Jeong-bok (Saenuri), due to his candidacy for the Metropolitan Mayor of Incheon.
 North Chungcheong Chungju: Yoon Jin-sik (Saenuri), due to his candidacy for the Governor of North Chungcheong.
 South Chungcheong Seosan-Taean: Sung Wan-jong (Saenuri), due to his violation of the Public Official Election Act.
 South Jeolla Suncheon-Gokseong: Kim Sun-dong (UPP), due to his violation of the Firearms, Knives and Explosives Regulation Act.
 South Jeolla Naju-Hwasun: Bae Ki-woon (NPAD), due to his violation of the Public Official Election Act.
 South Jeolla Damyang–Hampyeong–Yeonggwang–Jangseong: Lee Nak-yon (NPAD), due to his candidacy for the Governor of South Jeolla.

Results
The ruling conservative Saenuri Party gained seats and retained their majority in the National Assembly. The liberal party NPAD conceded defeat. Later, the NPAD split into two political parties: the Democratic Party of Korea, led by Moon Jae-in, and the People's Party, led by Ahn Cheol-soo.

2014
2014 elections in South Korea